Serrano Football Club, usually known simply as Serrano, is a Brazilian football team from the city of Petrópolis, Rio de Janeiro state.

History
The club was founded on 29 June 1915. It was Garrincha's first professional team.

Achievements
 Campeonato Fluminense:
 Titles (2): 1925, 1945
 Campeonato Carioca Segunda Divisão:
 Titles (1): 1992
 Campeonato Carioca Módulo Extra:
 Titles (1): 1999

Stadium
The home stadium Atílio Marotti has a capacity of 15,000 people.

Colors
The official colors are blue and white.

Club kits
The home kit is a blue shirt, white shorts and blue socks. The away kit is a white shirt, blue shorts and white socks.

Mascot
The team's mascot is a lion dressed in the team's kit named Leão da Serra (in English, Mountain Lion).

References

External links
Official website

 
Association football clubs established in 1915
Football clubs in Rio de Janeiro (state)
1915 establishments in Brazil